The 2019 Sánchez-Casal Cup was a professional tennis tournament played on clay courts. It was the second edition of the tournament which was part of the 2019 ATP Challenger Tour. It took place in Barcelona, Spain between 30 September and 6 October 2019.

Singles main-draw entrants

Seeds

 1 Rankings are as of 23 September 2019.

Other entrants
The following players received wildcards into the singles main draw:
  Íñigo Cervantes
  Enrique López Pérez
  Alejandro Moro Cañas
  Jaume Pla Malfeito
  Oriol Roca Batalla

The following players received entry into the singles main draw as alternates:
  Daniel Muñoz de la Nava
  Ante Pavić
  Ronald Slobodchikov

The following players received entry from the qualifying draw:
  Max Andrews
  Tomislav Brkić

The following player received entry as a lucky loser:
  Gerard Granollers

Champions

Singles

  Salvatore Caruso def.  Jozef Kovalík 6–4, 6–2.

Doubles

  Simone Bolelli /  David Vega Hernández def.  Sergio Martos Gornés /  Ramkumar Ramanathan 6–4, 7–5.

References

Sánchez-Casal Cup
2019 in Spanish sport
September 2019 sports events in Spain
October 2019 sports events in Spain